Sabatino is both an Italian surname and a masculine Italian given name. Notable people with the name include:

Surname:
Anthony Sabatino (1944–1993), American art director
Daniela Sabatino (born 1985), Italian footballer
Dean Sabatino (born 1962), American musician
Gennaro Sabatino (born 1993), Italian motorcycle racer
Hugo Sabatino, Argentine-Brazilian physician
Michael Sabatino (born 1955), American actor
Nicola Sabatino (1705–1796), Italian composer
Pasquale Di Sabatino (born 1988), Italian racing driver

Given name:
Sabatino Mangini (born 1977), writer and professor of English
Sabatino Moscati (1922–1997), Italian archaeologist and linguist
Sabatino de Ursis (1575–1620), Italian Jesuit and missionary

Italian-language surnames
Italian masculine given names